Iglesia de Santo Tomé (Priandi) is a church in Asturias, Spain.

References

Churches in Asturias